The Bristol Pitbulls are an ice hockey team representing Bristol, England, currently playing in the NIHL National League. Following the closure of the Bristol ice rink in 2012, their home ice moved to Oxford Ice Rink. In October 2021, the team returned to Bristol, winning their first fixture on their new home ice at the Planet Ice rink at Cribbs Causeway.

The team has an active official supporters' club, known as The Pack.

Club roster 2022–23
Source:

(*) Denotes a Non-British Trained player (Import)

2021/22 Outgoing

History

Background
Bristol hadn't had an ice hockey team in the British senior leagues since the Bristol Bulldogs had folded after just one season in 1993. However, the Bristol Junior Ice Hockey Club had remained in place and was still producing players who would go on to play for senior teams elsewhere in the country.

One of those players was Richie Hargreaves, who had spent his career playing for teams in Cardiff, Swindon, Isle of Wight, Basingstoke, Slough and London. In the summer of 2008, Hargreaves initially decided to take some time away from playing with a view to setting up a senior team in Bristol the following season. However, due to the sacking of the coach at his brother Mike's team, the Oxford City Stars, Hargreaves was persuaded to continue playing, in addition to becoming a head coach for the first time, whilst working on his plans for the team that would become the Bristol Pitbulls.

On 13 December, a trial game against the Vectis Tigers was put on in Bristol Ice Rink to test the viability of running a senior team in the rink. Bristol won the game 13-9 in front of a crowd of 350. The evening was regarded as a success, and so a decision was taken to apply to put a team into the senior leagues for the 2009-10 season.

Initially, the English Ice Hockey Association offered the opportunity for the team to go straight into ENL South Division 1. However, with a lack of local players ready to play at that level, Hargreaves opted to start in Division 2, deciding that his team "wasn't ready" and that "building a strong franchise and fan-base were the most important objectives for the first year."

Inaugural season 

Hargreaves spent the summer recruiting players for the team. With few local, experienced players, a result from the 16-year absence of senior hockey in the city, the team was largely filled with players from Bristol’s u18 and rec teams, along with inline hockey players from the region.

The Bristol Pitbulls played their first official game in a pre-season friendly at Bristol Ice Rink against Hargreaves' old club, the Oxford City Stars on 29 August 2009. While Bristol failed to win that game, and the return leg in Oxford the following night, the experience helped make sure the team were more ready for the start of the season.

Bristol's first competitive game saw the Vectis Tigers, now re-branded as the Wightlink Tigers, return to the city for an ENL2 Cup First Round match. A 9-3 win for Bristol set the tone for the season, as Pitbulls went on to lose only six times in their 32 games across both league and cup competitions.

It was the league which saw the team win their first title, after coming out top in a season-long battle against local rivals, the Swindon ENL Wildcats. Both teams tied on points, but Bristol's better record against their rivals earned them the tie-break. However, the close nature of the competition ensured that Bristol were forced to fight to the end. A 3-3 tie at home to the Invicta Mustangs, twice needing to come from behind in the game's dying minutes, providing the foundation required to seal the title against the Streatham Bruins in the Streatham Ice Arena.

Swindon would get their revenge in the Cup, however, winning both legs of the final.

Into Division 1
As winners of Division 2, the rules of competition at the time allowed Bristol to decide if they wanted to be promoted to Division 1. While winning Division 2 at the first attempt meant the decision needed to be made earlier than expected, Bristol elected to take their place in Division 1, as did the Swindon ENL Wildcats as Division 2 runners-up.

Bristol strengthened over the summer, bringing in players with experience in the higher leagues. They also took the opportunity to create a second feeder team in Division 2 for those players that were not felt to yet be ready to make the step up. However, both teams suffered a difficult first season in their leagues.

The Division 1 team swept their season-series against Swindon, a result that effectively prevented them from being relegated. But, they only found another three wins in the forty-game schedule and finished a distance off of the mid-table teams in second-last position. The Division 2 team finished bottom of their league after the team were docked the points from a home win over the Peterborough Islanders for playing an illegible player. The two points lost would have placed the team above the Streatham Bruins.

But, surviving that first season in Division 1 gave the team credibility, allowing them to attract more established players. The headline summer signing was Egidijus Bauba, the most capped player ever for the Lithuania national ice hockey team, from the Swindon Wildcats in the English Premier Ice Hockey League. As a result, Bristol were able to hold their own in the league, finishing sixth and qualifying for their first ever playoffs.

The Division 2 farm team also fared better, winning 9 of their 24 games to finish 10th out of 13 teams.

The biggest news came in January 2012 when it was announced that Bristol Ice Rink planned to close, leaving the team's future unclear as they closed out the season.

Having qualified for the playoffs, the Division 1 side faced the previous season's league champions, the Wightlink Raiders, in the first round. Bristol put up a strong performance, losing both games by two-goals each. The team's 8-6 defeat in the second leg would be the last senior game every held in Bristol Ice Rink.

Life without a rink
Hoping that the ice rink closure could be delayed, Bristol decided to continue into the 2012-13 season. However, a compromise was accepted where the team would only play in the re-branded National Ice Hockey League South Division 2. Furthermore, they backloaded their fixture list so that all of their home games would be in the second half of the season.

In the end, there would be no reprieve for the rink, and so Bristol were forced to find ice time elsewhere in order to stay in operation. Home games were played in Swindon, Oxford,  Basingstoke and Solihull as the team spent the entire season playing catch up in the schedule. The team were the last to fall out of the title chase, leaving the Oxford City Stars as champions. Slightly deflated, Bristol struggled in their remaining games, eventually finishing in fourth.

Having survived a first season on the road, the team agreed to keep on playing until a new rink was built in their own city. Regular ice time was found in Oxford Ice Rink which gave the team some stability and allowed them to put together their best season since their inaugural season in 2009. The team would have a strong fight all season long against their cohabitants in Oxford. Stars would win that season-long series 3 games to 2, including a 3-1 defeat in the Cup Final in Oxford.

In one of the tightest races in the league's history with five teams still in with a chance of winning with two weeks left, Bristol eventually finished in third place. They had the best record against the teams in the top half of the table, including a season-sweep against the runners-up, the Slough Jets. Ultimately, it would be dropped points against the weaker teams that would cost Bristol the championship.

The 2014-15 season started with the promise that the previous season could be built upon. But, a win against the Basingstoke Buffalo in September would be their last of the year as the team went on a disastrous streak of seven games without a win.

Bristol strengthened over the Christmas break, bringing in Steve Osman and Jamie Newton back to the club after both had been playing for Division 1 teams earlier in the season. Both had an immediate impact and Bristol would go on to go unbeaten in the second half of the season. The run would see the team win the Western Conference in their last game of the season against the Wightlink Tigers. The Peterborough Islanders were dispatched with ease in the playoff semi-finals to set up a final between the conference winners, after Slough had easily beaten Basingstoke in the other semi-final.

A 4-0 shut-out in their home leg, played in Swindon, gave Bristol control of the series and their first ever double after winning the second leg 5-4.

The following two seasons, were a disappointment, however. The team never really got going, missing out on the playoffs and only scraping into the cup semi-finals in their last qualification game in 2015-16 and then failing to qualify for the cup semi-finals and losing 14-6 to the Peterborough Islanders on aggregate in the playoff semi-finals.

Home Again
On the 30th October 2021, after 3492 days since they played in Bristol, Goaltender John Dibble led the Pitbulls onto their new home ice to face the Romford Raiders at the Ice Planet rink at Cribbs Causeway. Bristol's Jay Warren was the first scorer in a 6-1 win.

In March 2022, it was announced that the Pitbulls would be moving to the NIHL National League in the 2022/23 season.

Franchise records
(as of 29 Nov 2021)

Club Honours
 2009-10 ENL South Division 2 Champions
 2011-12 John Nike Cup Champions
 2014-15 NIHL South Division 2 Western Conference Champions
 2014-15 NIHL South Division 2 Playoff Champions

Club Records
Club records cover both the Bristol Pitbulls and their second, development team.
 Most games without defeat: 20 (January 2015 - October 2015)
 Most goals scored by both teams in a game: 26 (6-20 @ Solent Junior Devils, 15 March 2020)
 Most goals scored by Pitbulls in a game: 21 (4-21 @ Lee Valley Lions, 6 February 2010)
 Biggest winning margin: 17 (4-21 @ Lee Valley Lions, 6 February 2010)
 Fewest goals scored by both teams in a game: 1 (0-1 v Slough Jets, 27 November 2021)
 Biggest losing margin: 15 (16-1 @ Solent & Gosport Devils, 19 September 2010)
 Most goals conceded in a game: 16 (16-1 @ Solent & Gosport Devils, 19 September 2010)
 Most shots without scoring in a game: 61 (0-1 v Slough Jets, 27 November 2021)

Player Records

Career Records
 Most games: 291, Richie Hargreaves
 Most goals: 185, Olly Shone
 Most assists: 301, Richie Hargreaves
 Most points: 441, Richie Hargreaves
 Most penalty minutes: 1041, Richie Hargreaves
 Most points by a defenceman: 134, Mike Hargreaves
 Most points by a netminder: 3, Ross Webster
 Longest goal-scoring streak: 10, Zach Dolphin (2019-20)
 Youngest player: 16 years and 3 days, Josh Shaw (24th October 2021 @ Oxford City Stars)
 Youngest goal scorer: 16 years and 23 days, Josh Shaw (13th November 2021 v Invicta Dynamos)
 Most career games without a goal (non-netminder): 35, Graham Chilcott

Season Records
 Most goals, all competitions: 33, Sam Hayman (2009-10)
 Most goals, league: 32, Steve Fisher (2011-12)
 Most assists, all competitions: 52, Richie Hargreaves (2009-10)
 Most assists, league: 46, Steve Osman (2011-12)
 Most points, all competitions: 83, Richie Hargreaves (2009-10)
 Most points, league: 72, Steve Osman (2011-12)
 Most penalty minutes, all competitions: 190, Alan Armour (2010-11)
 Most penalty minutes, league: 190, Alan Armour (2010-11)

Game Records
 Most goals: 6, Sam Hayman (v Romford Fury, 2009-10) and Adrian Smith (@ Wightlink Tigers, 2011-12)
 Most assists: 9, Richie Hargreaves (@ Lee Valley Lions, 2009-10)
 Most points: 10, Richie Hargreaves (@ Lee Valley Lions, 2009-10)

Season-by-Season Record

References

External links
Bristol Pitbulls homepage

Ice hockey teams in England
National Ice Hockey League clubs
Ice hockey clubs established in 2009
Sport in Bristol